Jakob Erik Silfverberg (born October 13, 1990) is a Swedish professional ice hockey winger and an alternate captain for the Anaheim Ducks of the National Hockey League (NHL).

Playing career
On June 27, 2009, Silfverberg was drafted by the Ottawa Senators in the second round of the 2009 NHL Entry Draft, 39th overall. On May 30, 2011, he signed a three-year, entry-level contract with Ottawa, though he elected to return to Sweden and continue to play for Brynäs IF for the 2011–12 season rather than to make the move to North America.

Silfverberg was named the winner of the Guldhjälmen award as the most valuable player (MVP), as voted by the players in the Elitserien, for the 2011–12 regular season, as well as the Guldpucken as player of the year. He finished the regular season with 24 goals and 54 points in 49 games, ranking second in the Elitserien scoring race behind Robert Rosén of AIK, who scored 21 goals and 39 assists for 60 points. Silfverberg's point totals represented a 20-point jump from his totals in the 2010–11 campaign, in which he registered 34 points (18 goals and 16 assists).

Silfverberg's offensive success continued in the Elitserien playoffs, and his production was a large factor in Brynäs' eventual Swedish championship title, scoring 13 goals and seven assists for 20 points. His 13 goals set a new record for total goals scored by a single player in the playoffs, surpassing Daniel Alfredsson's previous record of 12 goals set in the 2004–05 season. Ultimately, Silfverberg was also awarded the Stefan Liv Memorial Trophy as the MVP of the playoffs. During the semi-finals, Silfverberg took over the role as the captain of Brynäs, following Andreas Dackell's retirement. He also wore the number 100 on his jersey during the second half of the season, in honor of Brynäs' 100th anniversary (the club was founded in 1912).

After the Elitserien playoffs concluded, Silfverberg joined the Ottawa Senators for their run in the 2012 Stanley Cup playoffs. He made his NHL, as well as his Stanley Cup playoff, debut on April 23, 2012, in Game 6 of the Eastern Conference Quarter-final series against the New York Rangers. Registering nine minutes of ice time, Silfverberg recorded one shot on goal in the Senators' 3–2 loss. The Senators were eliminated from the playoffs in Game 7 of the series.

In the second Senators game after the resolution of the 2012–13 NHL lockout, Silfverberg scored his first career NHL goal on January 21, 2013, against José Théodore of the Florida Panthers. On July 5, 2013, Silfverberg was traded to the Anaheim Ducks, along with forward Stefan Noesen and a first-round draft pick in 2014, in exchange for forward Bobby Ryan.

On August 15, 2014, the Ducks announced they had re-signed Silfverberg as a restricted free agent to a one-year, $850,000 contract.

On August 7, 2015, the Ducks signed Silfverberg a four-year contract extending until the 2018–19 season with an annual salary cap of $3.75 million.

On February 20, 2019, the Ducks announced they had re-signed Silfverberg to a five-year contract worth $26.25 million and will carry an annual cap hit of $5.25 million

International play

Silfverberg represented Sweden at the 2010 World Junior Championships held in Saskatchewan, Canada. He also played for the Sweden squad for the 2011 IIHF World Championship, earning a silver medal.

Silfverberg represented his country again at the 2012 World Championship, scoring two goals in eight games.

Personal life
Silfverberg's father, Jan-Erik, played defence with Brynäs IF for 11 seasons, winning four Swedish championships (in 1972, 1977, 1978 and 1980), as well as a World Championship silver medal in 1977. Jakob's uncle Conny also played for Brynäs for several seasons, also winning a Swedish championship in 1980 and scoring the most points in the 1984–85 Elitserien season.

Career statistics

Regular season and playoffs

International

Awards and honors

References

External links
 

1990 births
Anaheim Ducks players
Binghamton Senators players
Brynäs IF players
Ice hockey players at the 2014 Winter Olympics
Living people
Medalists at the 2014 Winter Olympics
Olympic ice hockey players of Sweden
Olympic medalists in ice hockey
Olympic silver medalists for Sweden
Ottawa Senators players
Ottawa Senators draft picks
Stefan Liv Memorial Trophy winners
Swedish ice hockey right wingers
People from Gävle
Sportspeople from Gävleborg County